State Highway 25 (SH 25) is a New Zealand state highway that runs eastwards across the Hauraki Plains then northwards up the western side of Coromandel Peninsula and down the eastern side to Waihi. The route is very scenic and provides access to idyllic beach holiday locations. It is a major road for holidaymakers and tourists, with the summer period around Christmas and New Year's Eve a particularly busy time. It is single carriageway for the entire route. The road is windy in many parts and prone to accidents. It is part of the Pacific Coast Highway. There is one spur road, SH 25A, which cuts across the peninsula west to east, almost intersecting SH 25 at both ends.

Route

The road continues north on the western side of Coromandel Peninsula, skirting the Firth of Thames, into the small township of Coromandel before travelling eastwards across the peninsula to Kūaotunu on the Bay of Plenty side. There it turns south to Whitianga, running through the outskirts of the town on the Whitianga Bypass, and on through Coroglen and Whenuakite, then over windy hill roads into Tairua, where Pauanui is accessible on a side road. SH 25 continues southwards through the intersection with the spur highway SH 25A just south of Hikuai and on towards Whangamatā. The road bypasses Whangamatā on the west side and continues southbound until it terminates in Waihi at the intersection of Kenny Street & Rosemont Road.

Spurs

State Highway 25A (SH 25A) traverses Coromandel Peninsula west to east directly from Kopu to Hikuai. This 28.2 km road, opened on 23 March 1967 and sealed in 1973, begins at an intersection with SH26 just 400m away from the SH 25/SH 26 intersection. It terminates at SH 25 just south of Hikuai. SH 25A closed indefinitely in January 2023 due to a large landslide that destroyed a stretch of the road.

Route changes

SH 25 once went through the town centres of Whitianga and Whangamatā. In Whitianga, the bypass was constructed carrying traffic away from the original route via Buffalo Beach Road, Albert Street, and South Highway. In Whangamatā, SH 25 bypasses the town via Tairua Road instead of using Harry Watt Drive, Hetherington Road and Port Road.

In the early 2000s the last sections of the highway were sealed, mainly on the northern part between Coromandel township and Whitianga. In 2011 NZTA completed the new Kopu Bridge, a two-lane structure, across the Waihou River. It replaced the previous one-lane bridge, where at times holidaymakers had to queue for hours to cross. The old bridge, which was built in 1928, is scheduled to be deconstructed although a key part of its history will be preserved.

Major junctions

See also
List of New Zealand state highways

References

25
Coromandel Peninsula
Transport in Waikato
Firth of Thames